Sode is a village near Sirsi in the Uttara Kannada district of Karnataka in India.

Location

Sodhe is a village in the Malenadu region, surrounded by thick forests. It is 22 km from Sirsi and 13 km from Hulekal.

Prehistoric rock art

Prehistoric Rock art has been found near Sodhe.
 It comprises engravings and drawings dated to c. the first millennium BCE. In them, double sided squares with intersecting loops are engraved/ drawn. Such drawings have also been found at Hire Benakal, Gavali, Karnataka. They have some resemblance to present day rangoli/ rangavalli.

History
Sodhe or Sonda has a long, recorded history. Sonda kingdom was established in 1555 by Arasappa Nayaka, a Jain chieftain (1555-1598). Sonda was ruled by Sonda Nayakas for more than two hundred years (1555–1763). Arasappa Nayaka as vassal of Vijayanagara Dynasty till the fall of Vijayanagara to the Adil Shahis in 1565. He continued as the subordinate ruler of Adil Shah till his death in 1598. Arasappa Nayaka established Vadiraj Matha in Sonda which is still in existence.   Shivaji, the Maratha Emperor conquered Sonda during 1674 and gave it back to Sonda ruler, Sadashiva Nayaka.   Hyder Ali, the Sultan of Mysore attacked Sonda in 1763 and totally destroyed it. The last chief of Sonda, Immodi Sadashivaraya escaped to Portuguese Goa. The ruins of the fort which was protecting Sonda is covered with overgrowth of shrubs. According to Imperial Gazetteer of India, five carved pillars, approximately 3 feet high are the remains of the Sonda palace.

Jain monasteries, (Swadhi jain matha) and Digambar Jain temples are also situated at Sodhe.

This village is special because it is the headquarters of the Sode Matha. The Sode Matha is part of the Ashta Mathas set up by Sri Madhvacharya.

References

External links
Bhaavi Sameera
Sri Sode Vadiraja Mutt
Shree Swarnavalli Matha

Ashta Mathas of Udupi
Hindu monasteries in India
Rock art in India